Arepera Socialista is a chain of fast food restaurants operated by the government of Venezuela, featuring arepas (a thick, moist cousin of tortillas, filled with meat, cheese, or other ingredients).

The company was started in 2009 as a government response to the high cost of private restaurants in Caracas, Venezuela. It sells arepas at 25% of the cost of private businesses, a discount the government says is made possible by the use of government-owned suppliers. In 2010, six employees were arrested for stealing cash from the company.

In one of the secret diplomatic cables released as part of the United States diplomatic cables leak in 2010, a United States embassy staff member described the enterprise as one of "Socialism's Tangible -- and Tasty -- Benefits".

As 2016 all stores close due to lack of raw material.

References

Restaurants established in 2009
Restaurant chains
Venezuelan cuisine
Restaurants in Venezuela
Defunct restaurants
Defunct restaurant chains
2009 establishments in Venezuela
Restaurants disestablished in 2016
2016 disestablishments in Venezuela